Mesarci is a village in the municipality of Vladimirci, Serbia. According to the 2002 census, the village has a population of 592 people.

References

Populated places in Mačva District